The grapheme Ř, ř (R with háček, example of Czech pronunciation) is a letter used in alphabets of the Czech, Upper Sorbian languages and also in Kurdish languages when written in Latin script. It was also used in a proposed orthography for the Silesian language. A similar consonant can also be found in some Norwegian dialects (around Narvik), in Berber (especially in its Rif and Central Atlas varieties), and in some Spanish dialects as a variation of 'rr' (mainly Pastuso Spanish and some dialects in Ecuador).

Either can also be represented using the combining character .

Usage
In Czech it is used to denote , a raised alveolar non-sonorant trill. Its manner of articulation is similar to other alveolar trills but the tongue is raised; it is partially fricative. It is usually voiced, but it also has a voiceless allophone  occurring in the vicinity of voiceless consonants or at the end of a word. Its Polish equivalent is ⟨rz⟩.

In Upper Sorbian, it denotes the voiceless postalveolar fricative .

In Kurdish, it represents the voiced alveolar trill .

In Umbrian in transliterations of the native alphabet, it is used to designate a sound of unknown quality, generally deriving from earlier *d. The same sound is represented in the Latin alphabet by the sequence <rs>.

Tongue twister 
Czech: “Tři sta třicet tři stříbrných stříkaček stříkalo přes tři sta třicet tři stříbrných střech.”

Phonetically: .

English: “333 silver fire hoses squirted over 333 silver roofs”.

Encodings

See also
Czech alphabet
Sorbian alphabet
Kurdish alphabets

References

Latin letters with diacritics